Japalura dasi, also known commonly as the Agaupani mountain lizard or the Agaupani forest agama (Nepalese: Agaupani jangali chheparo or hariyo chheparo), is a species of lizard in the family Agamidae. The species is native to Nepal. It is listed as "Vulnerable" by the International Union for Conservation of Nature.

Etymology
The specific name, dasi, is in honor of Indian herpetologist, Indraneil Das.

Geographic range
J. dasi is endemic to the Bajhura District in Nepal.

Habitat
The preferred natural habitat of J. dasi is shrubland, but it can also be found in cultivated habitats.

Reproduction
J. dasi is oviparous.

References

Further reading
 

Japalura
Reptiles of Nepal
Endemic fauna of Nepal
Reptiles described in 2002